Rabangaki Nawai (born 9 June 1985) is a track and field sprint athlete who competes internationally for Kiribati.

Nawai represented Kiribati at the 2008 Summer Olympics in Beijing. He competed at the 100 metres sprint and placed 8th in his heat without advancing to the second round. He ran the distance in a time of 11.29 seconds.

Achievements

References

External links
 
 

1985 births
Living people
Athletes (track and field) at the 2008 Summer Olympics
I-Kiribati male sprinters
Olympic athletes of Kiribati
People from the Gilbert Islands